A Breath of October is a studio album by the band Cobweb Strange.

Track listing
Source: Allmusic

References

2002 albums
Cobweb Strange albums